Rogério Klafke, also known simply as Rogério (born 26 March 1971) is a Brazilian former professional basketball player. During his pro club career, Klafke won 5 Brazilian Championships, in the years 1997, 1998, 2000, 2001, and 2004. With the senior Brazilian national basketball team, Klafke competed at the 1994 FIBA World Cup, the 1996 Summer Olympics, the 1998 FIBA World Cup, and the 2002 FIBA World Cup.

References

External links
 
FIBA Profile
NBB Profile 
CBB Profile 

1971 births
Living people
2002 FIBA World Championship players
Associação de Basquete Cearense players
Associação Limeirense de Basquete players
Basketball players at the 1996 Summer Olympics
Brazilian men's basketball players
Clube Atlético Monte Líbano basketball players
CR Vasco da Gama basketball players
Franca Basquetebol Clube players
Olympic basketball players of Brazil
Power forwards (basketball)
Small forwards
Sportspeople from Porto Alegre
Unitri/Uberlândia basketball players
1998 FIBA World Championship players
1994 FIBA World Championship players